Ilino is a village in the northern part of the Resen Municipality of North Macedonia. The village is deserted.

Demographics
The last census in which Ilino still had permanent residents was in 1981.

References

Villages in Resen Municipality